Papyrus 39 (in the Gregory-Aland numbering), signed by 𝔓39, is an early copy of the New Testament in Greek. It is a papyrus manuscript of the Gospel of John, it contains only John 8:14-22. The manuscript paleographically had been assigned to the 3rd century. Written by professional scribe, in 25 lines per page, in large, beautiful letters. It has numbered pages.

Don Barker proposes a wider and earlier range of dates for Papyrus 39, along with Uncial 0232, Papyrus 88 and Uncial 0206; and states that all four could be dated as early as the late second century or as late as the end of the fourth century.

The Greek text of this codex is a representative of the Alexandrian text-type (proto-Alexandrian). Aland placed it in Category I. 𝔓39 shows agreement with Vaticanus and 𝔓75. There are no singular readings.

Guglielmo Cavallo published its facsimile in 1967.

The manuscript now resides in the Green Collection and is featured at the Museum of the Bible in Washington, D.C.

See also 
 Biblical manuscript
 John 8
 List of New Testament papyri
 Papyrus Oxyrhynchus

References

Further reading

External links 
 Robert B. Waltz. 'NT Manuscripts: Papyri, Papyri 𝔓39.'
 Text of the 𝔓39 with reconstructed lacunae
 Sotheby's

New Testament papyri
3rd-century biblical manuscripts
Early Greek manuscripts of the New Testament
Gospel of John papyri